Bias against left-handed people is bias or design that is usually unfavorable against people who are left-handed. Handwriting is one of the biggest sources of disadvantage for left-handed people, other than for those forced to work with certain machinery. About 90 percent of the world's population is right-handed, and many common articles are designed for efficient use by right-handed people, and may be inconvenient, painful, or even dangerous for left-handed people to use. These may include school desks, kitchen implements, and tools ranging from simple scissors to hazardous machinery such as power saws.

Beyond being inherently disadvantaged by a right-handed bias in the design of tools, left-handed people have been subjected to deliberate discrimination and discouragement. In certain societies, they may be considered unlucky or even malicious by the right-handed majority. Many languages still contain references to left-handedness to convey awkwardness, dishonesty, stupidity, or other undesirable qualities. In many societies, left-handed people have been historically forced as children to use their right hands for tasks which they would naturally perform with the left, such as eating or writing. In the late 20th century, left-handedness became less stigmatized, and in many countries, particularly the Western world, left-handed children were no longer forced to switch to their right hand.

Favorable perceptions

Among Incas left-handers were called (and now are called among the indigenous peoples of the Andes)  which has positive value. Peoples of the Andes consider left-handers to possess special spiritual abilities, including magic and healing.

The Third Sapa Inca—Lloque Yupanqui—was left-handed. His name, when translated from Quechua, means "the glorified lefthander."

In tantra Buddhism, the left hand represents wisdom.

In early Roman times, the left side retained a positive connotation, as the Augures proceeded from the eastern side. The negative meaning was subsequently borrowed into Latin from Greek, and ever since in all Romance languages.

In Russian, "levsha" (lefty, lefthander) became a common noun for skilled craftsman, after the title character from "The Tale of Cross-eyed Lefty from Tula and the Steel Flea" written in 1881 by Nikolai Leskov.

Unfavorable perceptions
The unfavorable associations and connotations of the use of the left hand among cultures are varied. In some areas, in order to preserve cleanliness where sanitation was an issue, the right hand, as the dominant hand of most individuals, was/is used for eating, handling food, and social interactions. The left hand would then be used for personal hygiene, specifically after urination and defecation. Personal hygiene rules in Islam requires this, as derived from hadith sources. These rules were imposed on all, no matter their dominant hand. Through these practices, the left hand became known as the "unclean" hand. Currently, amongst Muslims and in some societies including Nepal and India it is still customary to use the left hand for cleaning oneself with water after defecating. The right hand is commonly known in contradistinction from the left, as the hand used for eating.

In many religions, including Christianity, the right hand of God is the favored hand. For example, Jesus sits at God's right side. God's left hand, however, is the hand of judgement. The Archangel Gabriel is sometimes called "God's left hand" and sits at God's left side. Those who fall from favor with God are sent to the left, as described in Matthew 25: 32–33, in which sheep represent the righteous and goats represent the fallen: "And he shall separate them one from another, as a shepherd divideth his sheep from the goats. And he shall set the sheep on his right, but the goats on his left." In 19th-century Europe, homosexuals were referred to as "left-handed". In Protestant-majority parts of the United Kingdom, Catholics were called "left-footers", and vice versa in Catholic-majority parts of Ireland and Irish America.

Various innocuous activities and experiences become rude or even signs of bad luck when the left hand becomes involved. In some parts of Scotland, it is considered bad luck to meet a left-handed person at the start of a journey. In Ghana, pointing, gesturing, giving or receiving items with the left hand is considered taboo or rude. A person giving directions will put their left hand behind them and even physically strain to point with their right hand if necessary.

Forced use of the right hand
Owing to cultural and social pressures, many left-handed children were forced to write and perform other activities with their right hands. This conversion can cause multiple problems in the developing left-handed child, including learning disorders, dyslexia, stuttering and other speech disorders. Shifts from left- to right-handed are more likely to be successful than right to left, though neither have a high success rate. Successful shifters are more likely to become ambihanded than unsuccessful ones. Conversions can be successful with consistent daily practice in a variety of manual activities, but though activity in the non-dominant left-hemisphere of the brain will increase during tasks, so too will activity in the dominant right-hemisphere. Consistent left-handers have no higher activity in these task centers than converted left-handers, so it may be inferred that "attempts to switch handedness by educational training far from weakening the functional expression of lefthandedness in higher-order motor areas of the (dominant) right hemisphere in fact enhance it."

Many Asian countries force their children to become right-handed due to cultural perceptions of bad luck associated with the left hand. In India, Pakistan, Bangladesh and Indonesia, it has traditionally been perceived as "rude" behaviour to use the left hand for eating, as the left hand is commonly used for tasks considered "unclean".  In a 2007 study in Taiwan, about 59.3% of children studied had been forced to convert from left-handedness to right-handedness. The study took into account economic status of the children's families and found that children whose parents had less education were more likely to be forced to convert. Even among children whose parents had higher levels of education, the conversion rate was 45.7%. Among naturally left-handed Japanese senior high school students, only 0.7% and 1.7% of individuals used their left hand for writing and eating, respectively, though young Japanese are more likely to convert to using chopsticks right-handed than forks or spoons (29.3% to 4.6%). The proportion of females subjected to forced conversion is significantly higher compared to males (95.1% to 81.0%).

Malawians state their views that "the left hand is less skilled and less powerful than the right one" as main reasons for forcing left-handers to convert. Among students, teachers and parents, 75% said the left hand should not be used to perform habitual activities, and 87.6% of these believed left-handers should be forced to switch dominant hands. Parents and close relatives are most responsible for impressing these beliefs upon their children.

In the Soviet Union, all left-handed students were forced to write with their right hand in the Soviet educational system.

As a child British King George VI (1895-1952) was naturally left-handed. He was forced to write with his right hand, as was common practice at the time. He was not expected to become king, so that was not a factor.

Rise in acceptance of left-handedness
On March 8, 1971, The Florence Times—Tri-Cities Daily reported that left-handed people "are becoming increasingly accepted and enabled to find their right (or left) place in the world." The Florence Times—Tri-Cities Daily also wrote "we still have a long way to go before the last vestiges of discrimination against left-handedness are uprooted, however." The frequency of left-handed writing in the United States, which was only 2.1 percent in 1932, had risen to over 11 percent by 1972. According to an article by The Washington Post from August 13, 1979, a University of Chicago psychologist, Jerre Levy, said: "In 1939, 2 percent of the population wrote with the left hand. By 1946, it was up to 7 1/2 percent. In 1968, 9 percent. By 1972, 12 percent. It's leveling off, and I expect the real number of left-handers will turn out to be about 14 percent." According to the article by The Washington Post from August 13, 1979, "a University of Michigan study points out that left-handers may not be taking over the world but...7 percent of the men and 6 percent of the women over 40 who were interviewed were lefties, but the percentages jumped to well above 10 percent in the 18-to-39 age group." According to the article by The Washington Post of August 13, 1979, Dr. Bernard McKenna of the National Education Association said: "There was recognition by medical authorities that left-handedness was normal and that tying the hand up in a child often caused stuttering." In Japan, Tokyo psychiatrist Soichi Hakozaki coped with such deep-seated discrimination against left-handed people that he wrote The World of Left-Handers. Hakozaki reported finding situations in which women were afraid their husbands would divorce them for being left-handed. According to the aforementioned article, an official at the Japanese Embassy said that, before the war, there was discrimination against left-handers. "Children were not trained to use their left hand while eating or writing. I used to throw a baseball left-handed, but my grandparents wanted me to throw right-handed. I can throw either way." Today, in some local areas, discrimination may still remain, but on the whole, it seems to be over. There are many left-handers in Japan." In a further article in The Washington Post of December 11, 1988, Richard M. Restak wrote that left-handedness has become more accepted and people have decided to leave southpaws alone and to stop working against left-handedness. In an article by The Gadsden Times from October 3, 1993, the newspaper mentioned a 5-year-old named Daniel, writing: "the advantage that little Daniel does have of going to school in the '90s is that he will be allowed to be left-hander. That wasn't always the case in years past." In a 1998 survey, 24 percent of younger-generation left-handed people reported some attempts to switch their handedness.

In 1999, Swiss researchers took 1,700 Swiss adults ages 34–74 and divided them into age groups, with the youngest being 35–44 and the oldest being 65–74. The researchers found almost twice as many people in the youngest age group considered themselves left-handed when compared to the oldest age group. In addition, the incidence of the older group switching to their right hand for writing was more than triple that of the younger group. Researchers found that among the four age groups    and  the prevalence of left-handedness declined from 11.9% among 35 to 44 year olds and roughly 12.5% among 45 to 54 year olds to roughly 8% among 55 to 64 year olds and 6.2% among 65 to 74 year olds. Additionally, researchers found that only 26.6% of 35 to 44 year olds switched to right-handedness for writing and roughly 73% wrote with their left hand. Among 45 to 54 year olds, roughly 52% write with their right hand and roughly 48% write with their left hand. Roughly 85% of 55 to 64 year olds wrote with their right hand and roughly 15% of 55 to 64 year olds wrote with their left hand. 88.9% of 65 to 74 year olds wrote with their right hand while 11.1% wrote with their left hand.

In the early 1990s, there was controversy among researchers over whether left-handed people die earlier or whether it is due or not due to fewer left-handed people among the elderly. The debate was controversial and researchers argued that left-handedness was less common among the elderly because some left-handed people might die in accidents or injuries due to using objects made for right-handed people. Researchers also argued that left-handed people were less common among elderly people because people in the earlier 20th century often were forced to become right-handed, a practice that disappeared in the late 20th century.

In the late 20th century, many benefits were created for left-handed people in the United States: Specialty shops offering left-handed products appeared throughout the United States, and left-handed people could browse, in a counterclockwise direction if they wish, for such items as scissors and kitchen utensils. Additionally, public school and college purchasing agents specified that 10 percent of their desks are designed for left-handers.

Equipment

Because most people are right-handed, most everyday items are mass-produced for ease of use with the right hand. Tools, game equipment, musical instruments and other items must be specially ordered for left-handed use, if they are even produced and are usually more expensive than their right-handed counterparts. At least one specialty store sells only left-handed items.

Household items
Right-handed tools can be difficult, uncomfortable, or dangerous for left-handed people to use.

Scissors
For example, right-handed scissors are arranged so that, in the right hand, fingers and thumb push the blades together laterally, creating the shearing action essential to scissors' utility. In the left hand, however, fingers and thumb tend to force right-handed blades apart, so that, rather than being sheared, the work-material is merely hacked, as by a knife, or slips between the blades uncut. Left-handers using right-handed scissors will often try to compensate by forcing the handles apart laterally, causing discomfort or injury to the first knuckle of the thumb.

In addition, a right-handed person using right-handed scissors can easily see the cutting line, but for a left-handed user the upper blade obscures the view.

Many scissors are offered as "ambidextrous" or "suitable for right- or left-handed use". Typically, these are merely right-handed scissors with modified handles to permit use in the left hand with less discomfort, but because the blades are still arranged for right-handed use, they still do not perform as well in the left hand.

Computer input devices
Input devices for computers can present obstacles to left-handed operation if intended for right-handed use. Some computer set-ups have the mouse placed on the right side of the keyboard and unable to be repositioned to the left. The mouse itself is also sometimes shaped to fit the right hand better. The functions of mouse buttons, even on mice shaped to fit both hands, default to right-hand use. On two-button mice, the left button —under the index finger of a right-handed person— is the primary button, while the right button performs secondary functions. The on-screen pointers themselves are also configured for right-handed people. Most desktop operating systems allow a user to reverse the functionality of mouse buttons to accommodate left-handed use, but left-handed cursors sometimes need to be specially downloaded. Trackballs and touchpads are often shaped for right-handed use. Even with the ability to change the functionality of buttons, these devices may be difficult for left-handed use. For a left handed person there are computer mice designed for left handed use, but they are a much smaller segment of the marketplace.

Frequently used keyboard shortcuts are a designed to be used with the left hand on a QWERTY keyboard and requires, for left handed mouse users, that the left hand be moved from the mouse to the keyboard and back. Examples of this are Undo (Ctrl/Command+Z), Cut (Ctrl/Command+X), Copy (Ctrl/Command+C) and Paste (Ctrl/Command+V). Some of these shortcuts have right handed alternatives like Ctrl+Insert and Shift+Insert for copy and paste (on Windows systems). But for Cut the corresponding shortcut is Shift+Delete in all application except for Windows explorer itself where it is used to permanently delete a file.

On public/shared computers (family, library, schools, shop floor, ...) left handed users are often forced to use the computer with a right handed mouse. Because of this many left handed people use the right hand both on those and their personal device.

Video game controllers often have the action buttons on the right with the directional controls on the left. In first-person shooters, many games default to the right pointer-finger being used to fire, simulating a right-handed person pulling the trigger of the weapon. Certain systems' layouts, such as Nintendo's Wii U and 3DS, have games in which right-handed stylus use is assumed and can cause difficulty for left-handed players.

Knives

While European-style kitchen knives are usually symmetrical, Japanese kitchen knives have the cutting edge ground asymmetrically, having the cutting edge closer to the user's body with ratios ranging from 70 to 30 for the average chef's knife, to 90–10 for professional sushi chef knives; left-handed models are rare, and usually must be specially ordered or custom made. On the other hand, the majority of "flat ground" general-purpose knives typically have the cutting edge on the right, as with a left-handed knife, for aesthetic reasons rather than practical.

Cameras
One of the few cameras ever produced for left-handers was the half-frame Yashica Samurai. Cameras predominantly have the hand grip, shutter release, film wind lever and commonly used selection buttons, switches and dials controlled by the right hand. Lens controls (where present) tend to be accessible by either hand. When an unskilled left-handed person uses a right-handed camera the hand control can be less steady and hence produce camera shake leading to poorer pictures at low shutter speeds.

Musical instruments
Left-handed string instruments are produced, including guitars and violins. Trombones without a valve attachment can be assembled for either hand. Inverted trumpets and tubas are made, too, but although their valves are normally designed to be operated with the right hand, the prevailing belief is that left-handed players are not at a significant disadvantage; the French horn is always played with the left hand, and the hand dominance of the player is not considered important. Similarly, all classical woodwinds are played with left hand higher than the right regardless of player handedness; this favors the right hand (because it supports the instrument) in all cases but the bassoon, for which both the support and the majority of the keywork are in the left hand. Left-handed drummers set up drum kits the exact opposite to conventional right-handed setup (i.e. hi-hat on the right, bass pedal under the left foot, ride cymbal to the drummer's left, etc.). On pianos, the melody is almost always played with the right hand, whereas the accompaniment is played with the left. Generally, the melody is more complex, technically challenging, and requires more dexterity than the corresponding accompaniment.

Sports

A left-handed individual may be known as a southpaw, particularly in a sports context. It is widely accepted that the term originated in the United States, in the game of baseball. Ballparks are often designed so that batters are facing east, so that the afternoon or evening sun does not shine in their eyes. This means that left-handed pitchers are throwing with their south-side arm. The Oxford English Dictionary lists a non-baseball citation for "south paw", meaning a punch with the left hand, as early as 1848, just three years after the first organized baseball game, with the note "(orig. U.S., in Baseball)." A left-handed advantage in sports can be significant and even decisive, but this advantage usually results from a left-handed competitor's unshared familiarity with opposite-handed opponents. Baseball is an exception since batters, pitchers, and fielders in certain scenarios are physically advantaged or disadvantaged by their handedness. Some baseball players like Christian Yelich of the Milwaukee Brewers bat left-handed and throw right-handed because natural right-handers are often taught to bat left-handed due to the competitive advantage this provides. Approximately 12% of all MLB players in history, including 34% of all left-handed batters and 32% of top-tier players, are right-handed throwers who learned to bat left-handed.

In baseball, due to the direction in which curveballs and sliders break, it is generally accepted that the pitcher has an advantage when his handedness is the same as the batter's, and the batter has an advantage when they are opposite. For this reason, many baseball teams include a left-handed specialist pitcher, who is brought into the game specifically to pitch to dangerous left-handed batters in crucial situations. A left-handed first baseman uses a more fluid motion to tag out a baserunner returning to first base during a pickoff attempt by the pitcher and has less difficulty avoiding baserunners while presenting their glove as a target for other fielders to throw to. It is very uncommon to see a left-handed player playing any infield position other than pitcher or first basemen due to the clockwise flow of the game when throwing the ball around the bases. A fielder's handedness is either a physical advantage or hindrance for similar reasons throughout the infield positions, and left-handedness is not always the more desirable dexterousness.

Left-handed bowlers are usually at an advantage during ten-pin bowling competition when hooking the ball into the pins from the left side of the lane. As there are fewer left-handed players, the lane's left side is not used as much, and thus the applied oil pattern does not change as quickly as it does for right-handed bowlers.

In boxing, someone who boxes left-handed is frequently referred to as southpaw. The term is also used to refer to a stance in which the boxer places the right foot in front of the left, so it is possible for a right-handed boxer to box with a southpaw stance. Most boxers, southpaw or otherwise, tend to train with sparring partners who adopt an orthodox stance which gives southpaws an advantage, but some left-handed boxers such as Gerry Cooney and Oscar De La Hoya also used an orthodox stance, giving them other advantages. Manny Pacquiao is an example of a southpaw (although he writes with his right hand). In the popular boxing film series Rocky, the main character Rocky Balboa is a southpaw. Southpaw is also a term in professional wrestling, often giving them the advantage.
Fencing weapons feature left- and right-handed grips, and a left-handed fencer's stance is opposite that of a right-handed opponent. Although commonly asserted that left-handed fencers have an advantage over right-handed opponents because the line of defence favors their sword arm, this assertion describes both fencers in a mixed-handed duel, so neither competitor has a unique physical advantage. Thus the left-hander's advantage in fencing stems mostly from a right-hander's unfamiliarity with a left-handed stance.

The game of golf is most commonly played right-handed, and left-handed players typically must provide their own special golf clubs. The game can be played with both hands, provided the player has both left- and right-handed clubs, giving an advantage over one-handed players. Professional golfer Phil Mickelson plays left-handed though he is naturally right-handed.

In tennis, southpaws hold the racket in their left hand. Because of this, their grip of the handle is supposedly adjusted in a slightly different style from right-handed players. Some world champion left-handed tennis players include Jimmy Connors, Guillermo Vilas, John McEnroe, Martina Navratilova, Marcelo Ríos, Goran Ivanišević and Rafael Nadal.

When playing volleyball, left-handed players are at an advantage when placed on the right wing to spike. This is because the ball does not travel over their head in order for them to hit the ball, and is therefore easier for a lefty to hit the ball. However, the reverse is true for the left wing. Right handed players are at an advantage on the left wing because the ball does not pass over their head while they are jumping to hit, therefore making it easier to contact the ball.

Playing cards often have their pips printed only in the upper left corner assuming holding them with right hand. Such design may be uncomfortable for left-handed people who may prefer all four corners of the card to be used.

In snooker, when Ronnie O'Sullivan played with his left hand in the 1996 World Championship against Alain Robidoux, the Canadian accused him of disrespect and refused to shake hands after the match. A disciplinary hearing was held, at which O'Sullivan was asked to show he could play left-handed at a professional level.

Weapons

The vast majority of firearms are designed for right-handed shooters, with the operating handle, magazine release, or safety mechanisms set up for manipulation by the right hand, and fired cartridge cases ejected to the right. Also, scopes and sights may be mounted in such a way as to require the shooter to place the rifle against the right shoulder. A left-handed shooter must either purchase a left-handed or ambidextrous firearm (which are manufactured in smaller numbers and are generally more expensive and/or harder to obtain), shoot a right-handed gun left-handed (which presents certain difficulties, such as the controls being improperly located for the left hand or hot shell cases being ejected towards the shooter's body, especially the eyes or down the collar or right sleeve), or learn to shoot right-handed (which may be less comfortable or "natural"). A related issue is ocular dominance, due to which left-handed people may wish to shoot right-handed, and vice versa. Ocular dominance plays more of a role in shooting accuracy than does left versus right handiness. Therefore, ocular dominance will cause a preference on how a shooter chooses to hold a gun.

Some modern firearms are ambidextrous (e.g. the FN P90 and Heckler & Koch P7), or can be converted between right- and left-handed operation (e.g. the Heckler & Koch G36 and Steyr AUG). Bullpup rifles are particularly problematic for left-handers unless they can be reconfigured, since empty shells would be ejected straight into the shooter's face and cheek potentially causing injury, or otherwise designed from the ground up for ambidextrous use, often by way of complex ejection systems as seen on the FN F2000 and the Kel-Tec RFB. The British L85 Assault Rifle must be fired right-handed, placing left-handed soldiers at a disadvantage. In contrast, the Steyr AUG is a modular design and the ejection port and extractor can be switched/replaced to suit the handedness of the soldier operating it. The M-16 and its variants have a fixed ejection port, but being a conventional design (i.e. not bullpup) the ejection port is forward of the operator and hence able to be fired either-handed. Circa 1985, with the introduction of the M16A2 version, a case deflector was incorporated adjacent to the ejector port to direct discarded shells in a more forward direction, making the rifle even more left hand operator friendly. The deflector is not always effective, however, as the ejected shell still stands a chance of hitting the left-handed shooter's cheek, especially in windy conditions.

Lever action and pump action firearms present fewer difficulties for left-handers than bolt action weapons do. Many weapons with adjustable sights allow for left-handed use, but for a right eye dominant shooter it is necessary to adjust. In fact, most weapons adjust well enough that a weapon will not eject shells into a left-hander's eye.

Machinery
Power tools, machinery and other potentially dangerous equipment is typically manufactured with the right-handed user in mind. Common problems faced by left-handed operators include the inability to keep materials steady, and difficulty reaching the on/off switch, especially in emergency situations. Table saws, whose blades protrude from the top of a table and pose the risk of losing fingers or hands, have their cutting area on the right side. This makes it difficult for a left-handed operator to guide the material being cut, as it must be pushed to the right side to align with the fence to avoid kickback. On bandsaws, the blade teeth are on the left side of the blade, necessitating the material being cut to be pushed from the left side of the machine. However, at this angle, the casing of the machine containing the rest of the blade is on the operator's left side, making it extremely difficult to guide the wood with their left hand.

Handheld circular saws are made almost exclusively for right-handers, with the motor and grip on the right side. If held in the left hand, it is impossible for the operator to see what they are cutting. Tool manufacturer Porter-Cable produces a left-handed circular saw that can be purchased relatively inexpensively.

Language

Historically, the left side, and subsequently left-handedness, was considered negative. The word "left" itself derives from the Anglo-Saxon word lyft, "weak". In Ancient Greek both words meaning "left" were euphemisms: the word ἀριστερός, aristerós (the standard word in Modern Greek as well) is derived from ἄριστος, áristos, "best", and the word εὺώνυμος, euōnymos, "of good name", is another euphemism used in lieu of "ill-named". The Latin adjective sinister originally meant "left" but took on meanings of "evil" or "unlucky" by the Classical Latin era, and this double meaning survives in European derivatives of Latin, and in the English word "sinister". Alternatively, sinister comes from the Latin word sinus meaning "pocket": a traditional Roman toga had only one pocket, located on the left side. The right hand has historically been associated with skill: the Latin word for right-handed is dexter, as in "dexterity", meaning manual skill. These words continue to be used in describing the points of an escutcheon (heraldry) where the right side of a field is refereed to as "dexter" while the left side is "sinister". Even the word "ambidexterity" reflects the bias. Its intended meaning is "skillful on both sides". However, since it keeps the Latin root dexter, which means "right", it ends up conveying the idea of being "right-handed on both sides". This bias is also apparent in the lesser-known antonym "ambisinistrous", which means "left-handed [i.e., clumsy] on both sides".

In more technical contexts, "sinistral" may be used in place of "left-handed" and "sinistrality" in place of "left-handedness". In both Ancient Greek and Roman religion, auspices (usually the flight paths of birds, as observed by a bird-diviner, or augur) were thought to be unfavorable if appearing on the diviner's left-hand side and favorable if on the right: an ancient custom mentioned in Homer's Iliad and of apparently Middle Eastern origin (as attested in the Amarna correspondence, in which a king of Alashiya, i.e. Cyprus, requests an eagle-diviner from the Pharaoh of Egypt).

Meanings gradually developed from use of these terms in the ancient languages. In many modern European languages, including English, the word for the direction "right" also means "correct" or "proper", and also stands for authority and justice.

In Sanskrit, the word "वाम" (waama)
stands for both "left" and "wicked".
 
In most Slavic languages the root prav (right) is used in words carrying meanings of correctness or justice. In colloquial Russian the word левый (levyĭ) "left" means unofficial, counterfeit, strange. In Polish, the word prawo means "right" as well as "law", prawy means: lawful; the word lewy means "left" (opposite of right), and colloquially "illegal" (opposite of legal). The Czech slang term levárna (roughly "left business") denotes a suspicious, shady scheme or trickery.

In French,  (cognate to English direct) means both "right" and "straight", as well as "law" and the legal sense of "right", while gauche means "left" and is also a synonym of maladroit, literally "not right", meaning "clumsy". Spanish, Italian, Portuguese and German have similar constructs. The Spanish term diestro and the Italian term destro mean both "right-handed" and "skillful". The contemporary Italian word sinistra has both meanings of sinister and left (the masculine adjective for sinister being sinistro), and maldestro means "clumsy". The Spanish siniestra has both, too, although the "left" meaning is less common and is usually expressed by izquierda, a Basque word that made its way into Portuguese as well. In some Spanish-speaking countries, to do something por izquierda means to engage in corrupt conduct or employ illegitimate means, whereas por derecha or a derechas means to do it the right (legitimate) way. Also, in Spanish, to tell someone "Eres tan zurdo" means that they are being clumsy, though the literal meaning is "You're so lefty." In Portuguese, the most common word for left-handed person, canhoto, was once used to identify the devil, and canhestro, a related word, means "clumsy".

In Vietnamese, the word for "right", phải also means "correct" or "must". The word for "left" is trái, which also mean "wrong", "opposite". For example, "mặc áo trái" means "wearing a shirt inside out", or "làm trái ý" means going against someone's will.

In Romanian drept/dreaptă (coming from Latin directus) means both "right" and "straight". The word for "left" is stâng/stângă coming from Latin  (= stanticus) meaning "tired".

In German, recht means "right" in both the adjectival sense (correct) and the nominal (legal entitlement). The word for "left" is links, and is closely related to both link (underhand, questionable), and linkisch (clumsy).

The Dutch words for "left" (links, linker) and "right" (recht, rechts, rechter) have much the same meanings and connotations as in English. The adjective link means "cunning, shifty" or "risky". A linkerd is a "crafty devil". To look at someone over the left shoulder (iemand over de linkerschouder aanzien) is to regard him or her as insignificant. There is also a saying that goes "having 2 left hands", meaning that that person is clumsy.

In Irish, deas means "right side" and "nice". Ciotóg is the left hand and is related to ciotach meaning "awkward"; ciotógach (kyut-OH-goch) is the term for left-handed. In Welsh, the word chwith means "left", but can also mean "strange", "awkward", or "wrong". The Scots term for left-handedness is corrie fistit. The term can be used to convey clumsiness.

In Finnish, the word oikea means both "right" (okay, correct) and "right" (the opposite of left).

In Swedish, att göra något med vänsterhanden (literally "to do something with your left hand") means "to do something badly". In Swedish, vänster means "left". The term vänsterprassel means "infidelity", "adultery" and "cheating". From this term the verb vänstra is derived.

In Norwegian, the word "keivhendt" can be used as a way of saying "left-handed", but the word literally translated means "wrong-handed".

In Hungarian, the word for right is jobb, which also means "better". The word for left is bal, which also means "bad". In Estonian, the word pahem stands for both "left" and "worse" and the word parem stands for both "right" and "better".

In Turkish, the word for right is sağ, which means "alive". The word for left is sol, which means "discolor", "die", "ill".

In Chinese culture, the adjective "left" (Chinese character: , Mandarin: zuǒ) sometimes means "improper" or "out of accord". For instance, the phrase "left path" (zuǒdào) stands for unorthodox or immoral means.

In Korean, the word for right is oreun (오른), to be compared to the word meaning morally proper, orheun (옳은) which shares the same pronunciation.

In Hebrew, as well as in other ancient Semitic and Mesopotamian languages, the term "left" was a symbol of power or custody. There were also examples of left-handed assassins in the Old Testament (Ehud killing the Moabite king). The left hand symbolized the power to shame society, and was used as a metaphor for misfortune, natural evil, or punishment from the gods. This metaphor survived ancient culture and was integrated into mainstream Christianity by early Catholic theologians, such as Ambrose of Milan, to modern Protestant theologians, such as Karl Barth, to attribute natural evil to God in explaining God's omnipotence over the universe.

Expressions and colloquialisms

The left side is often associated with awkwardness and clumsiness. The Spanish expression "tener dos pies izquierdos", in English, the expression "to have two left feet", refers to clumsiness in the domains of football or dancing. A "left-handed compliment" is considered one that is unflattering or dismissive in meaning. The Polish expression "mieć dwie lewe ręce", Dutch "twee linkerhanden hebben", German "zwei linke Hände haben", the Bulgarian expression "dve levi ratse", French "avoir deux mains gauches", Hungarian kétbalkezes and Czech "Mít obě ruce levé" all mean "to have two left hands"—that one is clumsy or is a very poor handyman; the English equivalent is "to be all thumbs". Moreover, the German idiom "mit dem linken Fuß aufgestanden sein", the Spanish expression "levantarse con el pie izquierdo", the French expression "s'être levé du pied gauche", the Polish expression "wstać lewą nogą" and the Hungarian expression "bal lábbal kelt fel" (literally, to get up with the left foot) mean to have a bad day and do everything wrong or unsuccessfully, related to the English expression "to get up on the wrong side of the bed". The Welsh phrase "tu chwith allan" and the Polish expression "na lewą stronę" (left side out) refers to an object being inside-out. In Russian and Polish, the use of the term nalyevo (na lewo in Polish) means "on the left", but can also connote taking bribes or "sneaky" behavior. Balszerencse (lit. "left luck") is Hungarian for "bad luck"; balkézről született [person] (lit. "born from the left hand") means an illegitimate child.

There are many colloquial terms used to refer to a left-handed person, e.g. "southpaw" (USA). Some are just slang or jargon words, while other references may be offensive or demeaning, either in context or in origin. In some parts of the English-speaking world, "cack-handed" is slang for left-handed, and is also used to mean clumsy. The origin of this term is disputed, but some suggest it is derived from the Latin cacare, in reference to the habit of performing ablutions with the left hand, leaving the right hand "clean". However, other sources suggest that it is derived from the Old Norse word keikr, meaning "bent backwards". British people frequently use "cack-handed" to mean "clumsy", though it also means "left-handed".

Handwriting
Left-handed people who speak Arabic, Persian, Urdu, Hebrew or any other language that conventionally uses a right-to-left script do not have the same difficulties with writing. The right-to-left nature of these writing systems prevents left-handers from running their hand on the ink as happens with left-to-right languages. Because writing when moving one's hand away from its side of the body can cause smudging if the outward side of the hand is allowed to drag across the writing, it is considered easier to write the Latin alphabet with the right hand than with the left. Furthermore, it is considered more difficult to write legible Chinese characters with the left hand than it is to write Latin letters, though difficulty is subjective and depends on the person in question.

Left-to-right alphabets can be written smudge-free and in proper "forward slant" with the left hand if the paper is turned  turn clockwise (90 degrees to the right), and the left hand is drawn toward the body on forward strokes, and left to right on upward strokes (as expressed in directionality of the text). It is also possible to do calligraphy in this posture with the left hand, but using right-handed pen nibs. Otherwise, left-handed pen nibs are required in order to get the thick-to-thin stroke shapes correct for most type faces, and the left-handed calligrapher is very likely to smudge the text. Left-handed pen nibs are not generally easy to find, and strokes may have to be done backwards from traditional right-handed calligraphic work rules to avoid nib jamming and splatter. Left-handed people have an advantage in learning 19th-century copperplate hands, which control line-width by pressure on the point.

Civic life

Schooling
Because almost all students in public schools are right-handed, most commonly used implements are designed for right-handers, from pencil sharpeners to scissors to desks. The consequences to left-handed students can vary from decreased academic performance or physical ailments to nothing at all.

In many classrooms and lecture halls, desks are designed so that the writing surface is attached to the chair instead of separate from it. In this design, the desk is attached on the right side, offering an armrest for right-handed people to use while writing. In some of these desks, the writing surface does not extend fully to the left, necessitating a left-handed user to turn their body in order to write properly, sometimes causing back, neck and shoulder problems. This contorted posture may also cause the student to be accused of cheating. In some cases, however, large lecture halls will use left-handed desks on the left-most column of each section so that left-handed people can comfortably write without bumping against a neighbor.

This right-handed bias is reflected in standardized tests as well. Multiple-choice tests tend to put the question on the left side of the page and the answers on the right side. If the answers must be filled in within a separate booklet, it can be awkward and uncomfortable for a left-handed student to line up the booklet with the answers. The time it takes to find a comfortable, convenient position cuts into test-taking time, resulting in rushed answers and unchecked work.

In Vietnam, schools officially require students to write with their right hands, and some teachers of Grade 1 (when writing is taught) would implement that rule by deducting points from tests written by the left hand. The Civic Education textbook for grade 6 mentions a student thanking her old teacher for helping her write with her right hand, and stopping her from using her left hand to write.

The authors Ardila, Alfredo and Rosselli, Diego in their article "Handedness in Colombia: Some associated conditions" claims, "Attending school results in a significant social pressure to use the right hand, not only in writing but also in other activities."[83]

Employment
In research done on the relations of handedness and employment, researchers may start their experiments believing left-handers earn lower wages than their right-handed counterparts, due to effects like difficulty using right-handed tools and increased risk of illness. However, their findings are more complex. In studies in the United States and United Kingdom, it was found that left-handed men earn more than right-handed men; about 5% more in the UK. Conversely, left-handed women earn about 7.5% less than right-handed women.

During residency period in operation theatres, the right-handed surgeons get irritated by left-handed residents, and they give less performance scoring compared to their right-handed residents.

See also
 Cross-dominance
 Footedness
 Laterality
 Ocular dominance (eyedness)
 Edinburgh Handedness Inventory
 Geschwind–Galaburda hypothesis
 Handedness and mathematical ability
 Musicians who play left-handed
 Situs inversus
 Southpaw stance (boxing)
 Handedness and sexual orientation

References

External links
 Left Handers Club
 Handedness Research Institute

Handedness
Left